Gérald Gardrinier (born 14 October 1967 in Saint-Denis, Réunion), better known by his stage name Gérald de Palmas, is a French singer-songwriter.

Biography

Early life
Gérald de Palmas was born in France. His father was a land surveyor from Brittany and his mother was a French teacher from Réunion. At the age of 10, De Palmas' family left Réunion, to live in Aix-en-Provence, France.  At the age of 13, he discovered ska music, and became a fan of the UK band The Specials.  Then he met Étienne Daho and formed a group called Les Max Valentin together with Edith Fambuena and Jean-Louis Pierot. They released the single 'Les Maux Dits' in 1987, but De Palmas was uncomfortable with this group, and went solo.  After seven years of writing and singing solo, Da Palmas won a talent contest on the French M6 TV network.

Career
In 1994, Gérald de Palmas, or just De Palmas as an artistic name, released his first album La dernière Année (The Last Year), which contains the hit song Sur la Route (On the Road).  He won a Victoires de la Musique award in 1996.

De Palmas released his second album Les Lois de la Nature (Laws of Nature) in 1997.  The album was less successful than his debut album, probably due to the dramatic change in his style.  He was in the slumps for two and a half years, until 2000.  That's when Jean-Jacques Goldman restored his confidence and wrote a song for him titled J'en rêve encore (I still dream about it).

De Palmas composed and wrote 10 of the 12 songs in his third album Marcher dans le sable (Walking in the sand).  He was reborn as a star in 2002, as he won the Victoires de la Musique and the NRJ Music Awards, while playing more than 180 concerts.  His songs even crossed the Atlantic, when Céline Dion sang his hit song Tomber (falling) in English, titled Ten Days.  At the end of that year, Live 2002 was released on DVD and on CD, to commemorate his great tour of 2002.

Two years later, De Palmas returned with his fourth album Un homme sans racines (A man without roots), a more intimate album with less music, but still in the same melancholic style.
After having problems with Universal, Gérald de Palmas came back in November 2009 with his new album "Sortir" (Leaving) with the hit single "Au bord de l'eau".

His latest album is "La beauté du geste" released in the summer of 2016.

Awards 
NRJ Music Awards :
Best francophone male artist (2003)
Best francophone album (Marcher dans le sable) (2002)
Victoires de la musique :
Best male artist of the year (2002)
Male revelation of the year (1996)

Discography

Albums

 
Live albums

Singles

Featured in

References

External links 
 Official website
 broken link previous Official website
Biography of Gérald De Palmas, from Radio France Internationale
 Gérald de Palmas' music videos from his album "Sortir" : "Mon Coeur ne bat plus" & "Dans une Larme"

1967 births
Living people
French pop singers
French male singers
Musicians from Réunion
French folk-pop singers
Réunionnais singers